Rikuo or Rikuō may refer to:

 Mutsu Province (1868), also called , an old province of Japan
 , an old motorcycle manufacturing company in Japan
 Rikuo, a fictional character from the video game series Darkstalkers